Arabella Jane Sullivan (1 May 1796 – 27 January 1839) was a British author.

She was the daughter of Barbarina Wilmot, later Barbarina Brand, Lady Dacre, and Valentine Henry Wilmot. She married Reverend Frederick Sullivan (1797–1873), vicar of Kimpton, Hertfordshire (and fourth son of Sir Richard Sullivan, 1st Baronet) and was the mother of Barbarina Grey, Lady Grey and Sir Francis Sullivan, 6th Baronet.

She wrote Recollections of a Chaperon (1831) and Tales of the Peerage and Peasantry (1835), both collections of stories credited to her mother, but were written by her and only edited by her mother.

References

External links 
 

1796 births
1839 deaths
19th-century British novelists
19th-century British women writers